"Come with Me" is a song by English recording artist Phil Collins released as the second single from his seventh solo album Testify.

The song peaked at #16 on the U.S. Billboard Hot Adult Contemporary Tracks.

Formats and track listings
U.S. CD single
"Come With Me" - 4:34

Credits 
 All instruments played by Phil Collins except:
 Tim Pierce – guitars
 James Sanger – additional programming

Charts

References

2003 singles
Phil Collins songs
Songs written by Phil Collins
Song recordings produced by Phil Collins
Song recordings produced by Rob Cavallo
2002 songs